Judo at the 2018 Asian Games was held at the Jakarta Convention Center Plenary Hall, Jakarta, Indonesia, from 29 August to 1 September 2018.

Schedule

Medalists

Men

Women

Mixed

Medal table

Participating nations
A total of 252 athletes from 35 nations competed in judo at the 2018 Asian Games:

References

External links
 
 Judo at the 2018 Asian Games
 Official Result Book Judo at the www.ocagames.com

 
2018 Asian Games events
2018
Asian Games
Asian Games